The Diffs are an American punk band from Los Angeles, California, United States. Founded in 2003, their influences include original Los Angeles punk bands such as Black Flag, the Germs, The Weirdos, and X. Their MySpace page only identifies Ted Nugent as an influence.

The band is featured in the 2007 documentary, Punk's Not Dead.

Discography
 2005: The Diffs (Self-titled CD)
 2005: The Diffs: Live at the Key Club (DVD)

Trivia
Brothers Elvis Kuehn and Max Kuehn are the sons of T.S.O.L. keyboardist, Greg Kuehn. They are currently in the band FIDLAR.

External links
 Official Website
 The Diffs' MySpace Page

References

Punk rock groups from California
Musical groups established in 2003
Musical groups from Los Angeles